PFLAG (Parents, Families and Friends of Lesbians and Gays) is an American LGBTQ organization.

PFLAG may also refer to:

PFLAG Canada
PFLAG China

See also
Families and Friends of Lesbians and Gays